Stuart Noel Anderson (born December 25, 1959) is a former American football linebacker in the National Football League (NFL) for the Washington Redskins and Cleveland Browns.  He played college football at the University of Virginia and was drafted in the fourth round of the 1982 NFL Draft by the Kansas City Chiefs.

References

1959 births
Living people
Washington Redskins players
Cleveland Browns players
American football linebackers
Virginia Cavaliers football players
People from Mathews, Virginia
Players of American football from Virginia